Lanshan Mountains is a mountain range along the northern shore of the Yellow River east of the capital Lanzhou of the Gansu province in northwestern China.

The area of the Lanshan Mountains played a prominent role in the history of early China, changing hands many times in the course of events. After the fall of the Han Dynasty, a succession of states were located here: in the 4th century it was a capital of the independent state Earlier Liang, and from the 5th to the 11th century, it became a center for Buddhist study in China.

References 

Mountain ranges of Gansu
Sacred mountains
Sites along the Silk Road